DXMS (107.3 FM) is a radio station owned and operated by Subic Broadcasting Corporation. Its studios and transmitter are located at P-7 Navalca, Brgy. San Juan, Surigao City.

References

External links
DXMS FB Page

Radio stations in Surigao del Norte
Radio stations established in 2016